USS Bear was a dual steam-powered and sailing ship built with -thick sides which had a long life in various cold-water and ice-filled environs. She was a forerunner of modern icebreakers and had a diverse service life. According to the United States Coast Guard official website, Bear is described as "probably the most famous ship in the history of the Coast Guard."

Built in Scotland in 1874 as a steamer for sealing, she was owned and operated from Newfoundland for ten years. In the mid-1880s, she took part in the search for the Greely Expedition. Captained by Michael Healy of the United States Revenue Cutter Service (later part of the U.S. Coast Guard), she worked the  coastline of Alaska. She later assisted with relief efforts after the 1906 San Francisco earthquake.

Her services also included the second expedition of Admiral Richard E. Byrd to Antarctica, and again to the southernmost continent in 1941 to evacuate Americans at the beginning of World War II. She later served in patrol duty off the coast of Greenland for the United States Navy. Between some of these missions, she was a museum ship in Oakland, California, and starred in the 1930 film version of Jack London's The Sea-Wolf.

After World War II, Bear was returned to use again as a sealing vessel.

Construction and sealing career
Bear was built in 1874 as a sealer at Dundee, Scotland shipyards. Custom-built for sealing out of St. John's, Newfoundland,  Bear was the most outstanding sealing vessel of her day, the lead ship in a new generation of sealers. At the time of her arrival in St. John's, there were 300 vessels outfitted each season to hunt seals, but most were small schooners or old sailing barques. The new sealing ships represented by Bear radically transformed the Eastern North Atlantic seal fishery as they replaced the hundreds of smaller sealing vessels owned by merchants in outports around Newfoundland with large and expensive steamships owned by large British and Newfoundland companies based in St. John's. Owned at first by the Scottish firm W. Grieve and Sons, she was acquired in 1880 by R. Steele Junior. Bear spent a decade sealing from St. John. In 1884, the Steeles sent Bear back to Scotland for a refit.

American government service

The massive wooden hulls of Newfoundland sealing vessels had proved ideal for Arctic exploration. Just back from her refit in 1884 and ready for another season of sealing, Bear was instead purchased by the U.S. government in 1884.  Under command of Commander Winfield Scott Schley, Bear and took part in the search for the Lady Franklin Bay Expedition, whose seven survivors were found at Cape Sabine.

Bear served as a revenue cutter in the United States Revenue-Marine from 1885 to 1894 and the United States Revenue Cutter Service from 1894 to 1915 and as a cutter in the United States Coast Guard from 1915 to 1926. Throughout the years from 1885 to 1926, she made the seasonal trek each May from her port in Oakland, California, to sail north to the waters of the Territory of Alaska for the five-month season, cruising  on the Bering Sea Patrol, where she looked out for seal poachers, shipwrecked whalers, and illicit trade with Alaska Natives, ferried reindeer from Siberia to Alaska, and served as a floating courthouse. By order of the United States Department of the Treasury, Bear was given free run to arrest and seize possessions of poachers, smugglers, and illegal traders, as well as take census of people and ships, record geological and astronomical information, take note of tides, and escort whaling ships.

One captain of Bear, Michael "Hell Roaring Mike" Healy, was considered a savior by many of the whalers and native Eskimos, as he bought Siberian reindeer at his own expense for the starving natives to use as the foundation for a new herd in Alaska, paralleling, and possibly in cooperation with, missionary Sheldon Jackson. Healy was the first African-American commissioned officer in U.S. history, and during Captain Healy's and Bears 1891 Bering Sea Patrol, the following was accomplished:
 secured witnesses for a murder trial
 ferried reindeer
 sailed the Alaskan governor
 transported a U.S. geographical survey team
 carried lumber and supplies for school construction in remote areas
 delivered teachers to their remote assignments
 delivered mail for the U.S. Post Office Department
 enforced federal laws
 provided medical support to natives
 conducted search and rescue

During one of her yearly trips back to San Francisco, Bear assisted in rescue operations for 1906 San Francisco earthquake.
The Revenue Cutter Service was merged with the United States Life-Saving Service to form the United States Coast Guard on 28 January 1915 and the ship was renamed USCGC Bear.

Bear of Oakland

Cruising to Alaska for her last patrol in the 1926 season, on her return to Oakland that November she was replaced by a new cutter,  and ownership was transferred to the city for use as a large barquentine-rigged museum ship, Bear starred as the sealer Macedonia in the 1930 film version of Jack London's The Sea-Wolf.

In 1932 Bear of Oakland was purchased by Rear Admiral Richard E. Byrd for $1,050, as a replacement for the barquentine .  He used her in the Second Byrd Expedition alongside the old steel-hulled lumber ship Pacific Fir, renamed by Byrd , in honor of the New York brewer who was a major sponsor of expedition.

After the expedition, Admiral Byrd leased Bear to the Navy for one dollar a year, for use on his government sponsored (third) expedition.

United States Antarctic Service Expedition
On 11 September 1939 she was re-commissioned in the U.S. Navy for service during the 1939–1941 United States Antarctic Service Expedition, led by Rear Admiral Richard E. Byrd, and renamed USS Bear (AG-29). She carried a Barkley-Grow seaplane on board. Lieutenant Commander Richard H. Cruzen was captain of Bear during the expedition. Cruzen would rise to the rank of rear admiral and commanded the U.S. Navy ships which participated in a large Antarctic expedition named Operation Highjump in 1948.

In early 1941, USS Bear assisted in the evacuation of the members of the Antarctic Expedition, as international tensions rose in the months that led up to America's entrance into World War II. Bear arrived at the Mikkelsen Islands, just north of the Antarctic Circle, on 16 March 1941, and its crew helped to build an adequate airstrip to evacuate personnel and equipment from the expedition base in the area.

World War II

From 1941 to 1944, Bear served in the Northeast Atlantic Greenland Patrol. The rigging was cut down to two masts to become a fully motorized ship. When more modern ships were available to replace her, Bear was decommissioned on 17 May 1944 and laid up in Boston until the end of the war.

Bear had the distinction of being the oldest U.S. Navy ship to be deployed outside the continental United States during World War II. She was one of the last ships equipped with sails to serve in a theater of war. She was also one of a very few U.S. Navy ships to have served during the Spanish–American War as well as both world wars.

Postwar
Bear was purchased from the U.S. government in 1948 by Frank M. Shaw of Halifax, Nova Scotia for $5,199. Shaw intended to use the ship for sealing. Renamed Arctic Bear, her refit for sealing proved costly and with the decline of the large-scale Newfoundland seal hunt, she was laid up in Halifax Harbour subject to on and off again refits, and lay derelict for periods of times as she remained at various moorings around Halifax and Dartmouth.

By the early 1960s Bear was considered for restoration as a museum ship by the City of Dartmouth as well as her old home at Oakland and by the San Francisco marine museum. However the purchase price from Shaw Steamships and the extensive restoration costs scuttled museum plans.

In 1962 she was purchased by Alfred Johnston of Philadelphia for a floating seafood restaurant. Repairs were made to the ship at Industrial Shipping Limited in Mahone Bay, Nova Scotia for her new role including the carving of a new bear figurehead.

Sinking
She went down early in the morning of 19 March 1963 after a gale struck and severed the tow line. The mast collapsed and punctured the hull, causing the sinking. Her crew of two were rescued by Irving Birch.

Discovery of wreck
The search for Bear′s wreck began in 1979, when Dr. Harold "Doc" Edgerton of the Massachusetts Institute of Technology (MIT), the inventor of side-scan sonar, used a side-scan sonar deployed from a United States Coast Guard buoy tender to look for the wreck in the vicinity of Bear′s sinking. His effort was unsuccessful, but other searches of the  area ensued over the next 42 years, involving a variety of actors including MIT; the U.S. Navy; various elements of the U.S. Coast Guard including the Chief Historian′s Office, the Coast Guard Research and Development Center, and the United States Coast Guard Academy; the National Oceanic and Atmospheric Administration (NOAA); the Woods Hole Oceanographic Institution; the Commonwealth of Massachusetts; and the Government of Canada. On 14 October 2021, NOAA Commissioned Officer Corps Rear Admiral Nancy Hann announced the discovery in a press conference held on a pier in Boston adjacent to the Coast Guard icebreaker .

Legacy
Bears career lasted for 89 years.  She spent a total of 47 years in commissioned service of the United States Revenue Cutter Service, Coast Guard and Navy. She was one of only a few ships to have served in both polar regions.  She is also one of the very few ships to be on active service in the U.S. Armed Forces during the Spanish-American War, World War I and World War II.

There is a large detailed scale model of Bear on display in the Stockton Center for International Law, part of the United States Naval War College in Newport, Rhode Island.

The figurehead from Bear is in the collection at the Mariners' Museum in Newport News, Virginia.

The mascot of the United States Coast Guard Academy is Objee the bear, inspired by the Coast Guard Cutter Bear.  The athletic teams of the Coast Guard Academy are called the Coast Guard Bears.

Awards
 Spanish Campaign Medal
 World War I Victory Medal with "ASIATIC" clasp
 Second Byrd Antarctic Expedition Medal
 United States Antarctic Expedition Medal
 American Defense Service Medal with "A" device
 American Campaign Medal
 European-African-Middle Eastern Campaign Medal
 World War II Victory Medal
 Coast Guard Arctic Service Medal

Footnotes

Citations

References used

External links
 Haze Gray & Underway: "The Cutter Bear"
  A Trip To The Arctic With Uncle Sam, 1921 film includes footage of USCGC Bear
 McGoldrick Photographs, a collection of photographs taken of the USS Bear in Alaska in 1886

 

History of St. John's, Newfoundland and Labrador
Exploration ships
Arctic exploration vessels
Pre-statehood history of Alaska
Ships of the United States Coast Guard
Ships of the United States Revenue Cutter Service
Ships built in Dundee
1874 ships
Maritime incidents in 1963
Shipwrecks of the Nova Scotia coast
Water transportation in Alaska